Cam Akers (born June 22, 1999) is an American football running back for the Los Angeles Rams of the National Football League (NFL). He played college football at Florida State, and was drafted by the Rams in the second round of the 2020 NFL Draft.

Early years 
Akers attended Clinton High School in Clinton, Mississippi, where he played quarterback and running back for the football team. As a senior, he rushed for 2,105 yards and 34 touchdowns, and passed for 3,128 passing yards and 31 touchdowns. For his high school career, he had 13,243 yards and 149 touchdowns. Akers was named MS Gatorade Player of The Year He also played in the U.S. Army All-American Bowl and won the U.S. Army Player of the Year Award in 2016.

College career 
Akers was rated as a five-star recruit and was ranked among the top recruits in his class. He committed to Florida State University to play college football. During what was a generally forgettable 7-6 season, Akers set the team freshman record for rushing yards during the 2017 Independence Bowl, bringing his season total to 1,025 yards. This broke the previous record of 1,008 which was set by Dalvin Cook in 2014.

On December 14, 2019, Akers announced he would be skipping the Sun Bowl to enter the 2020 NFL Draft.

College statistics

Professional career

Akers was selected by the Los Angeles Rams in the second round, 52nd overall, in the 2020 NFL Draft.

2020

In Week 11 against the Tampa Bay Buccaneers, Akers scored his first career touchdown on a four-yard reception in the third quarter in a 27–24 victory. In Week 14 against the New England Patriots, Akers rushed for 171 yards on 29 attempts which marked the sixth-most rushing yards by any NFL player in a single game during the 2020 season and fourth-most by a Rams rookie in a single game in franchise history. The Rams won the game by a score of 24–3.
Akers was named the NFC Offensive Player of the Week for his performance in Week 14.

In the Wild Card Round of the NFL playoffs against the Seattle Seahawks, Akers rushed for 131 yards and a touchdown and caught 2 passes for 45 yards during the 30–20 win.
In the Divisional Round of the playoffs against the Green Bay Packers, Akers rushed for 90 yards and a touchdown during the 32–18 loss.

2021

On July 20, 2021, Akers tore his Achilles tendon while working out shortly before the start of training camp. Akers was expected to be sidelined for the entire 2021 season, as he was placed on the reserve/non-football injury list to start the season. However, Akers was activated to the active roster on December 25, 2021, 5 full months after his injury. Akers returned to action in Week 18 against the San Francisco 49ers, where he rushed for 3 yards on 5 carries, and caught 3 passes for 10 yards. In the Super Bowl, Akers had 13 carries for 21 yards and 3 receptions for 14 yards in the Rams 23-20 victory against the Cincinnati Bengals.

2022
Akers was expected to start Week 1, but ended up only getting 3 rushing attempts for 3 yards. Akers requested a trade from the Rams after Week 5, and did not play Week 6, 7, or Week 8. Akers returned to practice on November 3 and later denied requesting a trade.

Against the Denver Broncos in Week 16, Akers rushed for 118 yards and three touchdowns in the 51-14 win. He then rushed for 123 yards on 19 carries against the Los Angeles Chargers in week 17 and 104 yards on 21 carries against the Seattle Seahawks in week 18 and 3 catches for 24 yards, finishing the season with three consecutive 100 yard rushing games.

NFL career statistics

Regular season

Postseason

References

External links

Los Angeles Rams bio
Florida State Seminoles bio

1999 births
Living people
21st-century African-American sportspeople
African-American players of American football
American football running backs
Florida State Seminoles football players
Los Angeles Rams players
People from Clinton, Mississippi
Players of American football from Mississippi